Lubenham railway station was a railway station serving  Lubenham in the English county of Leicestershire. It was opened on the Rugby and Stamford Railway in 1850.

History
Parliamentary approval was gained in 1846 by the directors of the London and Birmingham Railway for a branch from Rugby to the Syston and Peterborough Railway near Stamford. In the same year the company became part of the London and North Western Railway. The section from Rugby to Market Harborough, which included Lubenham, opened in 1850. Originally single track, it was doubled at the end of 1878.

At grouping in 1923 it became part of the London Midland and Scottish Railway. The line and station closed in 1966.

References 

Former London and North Western Railway stations
Railway stations in Great Britain opened in 1850
Railway stations in Great Britain closed in 1966
Disused railway stations in Leicestershire
Beeching closures in England